On 9 May 2020, gunmen attacked several villages in the Tillabéri Region of Niger. At least twenty people were killed. The perpetrators and motive of the attacks are unknown.

Background
The Tillabéri Region is situated in a tri-border area where the boundary of Niger meets that of Burkina Faso and Mali. Niger has been under a state of emergency since 2017; this was extended shortly before the attacks took place. In the years leading up to the attacks, militant jihadist groups with ties to Al-Qaeda and Islamic State had increased their power and influence in the Sahel, making parts of that land "ungovernable".  In January 2019, the Nigerien government limited the use of motorcycles at all hours of the day in a bid to stymie insurgents operating in the area.

Attacks
From around 4:00 to 5:30 pm local time on 9 May 2020, an "unknown number" of gunmen on motorbikes attacked the villages of Gadabo, Zibane Koira-Zeno, and Zibane-Tegui in the Tillabéri Region. At least 20 people were killed. In addition, they ransacked shops, stole cereal and cattle, and ordered the villagers to leave. The gunmen then escaped to the north, in the direction of the border with Mali.

Initial response
The governor of the region, Ibrahim Tidjani Katchella, spoke to national radio the day after the attacks. He gave a basic overview of the attacks, but did not elaborate further.

References

2020 murders in Niger
2020 mass shootings in Africa
2020 murders in Africa
21st-century mass murder in Africa
Mass murder in 2020
Mass murder in Niger
Mass shootings in Africa
May 2020 crimes in Africa
May 2020 events in Africa
Terrorist incidents in Niger in 2020
Terrorist incidents in Niger
May 2020 attacks